"Him or Me – What's It Gonna Be?" is a song written by Mark Lindsay and Terry Melcher, recorded by American rock band Paul Revere & the Raiders for their seventh studio album Revolution!. It can be distinguished from other previous Raiders garage rock hits like "Kicks" and "Hungry" because of its more pop-flavored sound.

Released in 1967, the single, with the biographical "Legend of Paul Revere" as the B-side, became a hit after peaking at No. 5 on June 10. It would prove to be their fourth and last Top 10 hit, until "Indian Reservation (The Lament of the Cherokee Reservation Indian)".

The song is one of the two songs of Paul Revere & the Raiders, along with "Indian Reservation", to be included in the Kent Hartman's list of songs played by the Wrecking Crew in the book The Wrecking Crew: The Inside Story of Rock and Roll's Best-Kept Secret.

Composition and recording 
Like their previous Top 10 hit, "Good Thing", the song was written by Raiders lead singer Mark Lindsay and producer Terry Melcher like all the other Revolution! tracks. They used to write album cuts in their shared home in 10050 Cielo Drive, famous for the Tate-LaBianca murders. Melcher wrote the chorus and Lindsay developed the rest.

Initially, the latter thought that the writing credits were unfair, because he wrote most of the song, but later he concluded that "Him or Me" was Melcher's idea, and wouldn't write the song without him.

At the time, the band's tight schedule of television appearances made Melcher use the Wrecking Crew session musicians (specifically Hal Blaine, Ry Cooder, Jerry Cole and Glen Campbell) to do the instrumental backing of the song. Melcher also added backing vocals in addition of Lindsay's lead.

Chart performance

Cover versions 
An unknown group called "the Chellows" were the first to cover the song in 1967.

Rockabilly singer Mac Curtis recorded a cover of the song to his album Early In The Morning in 1970.

The Flamin' Groovies covered the song, along with another Paul Revere And The Raiders song, "Ups and Downs", in 1974.

The Wedding Present did a cover of the song in 1994.

Bun E. Carlos, with special guest Hanson, recorded a version of the song in 2016.  The lead vocal was performed by Taylor Hanson.

Susanna Hoffs recorded her own take on the song in 2021.

Notes

References 

1967 songs
1967 singles
Paul Revere & the Raiders songs
Songs written by Mark Lindsay
Songs written by Terry Melcher
Song recordings produced by Terry Melcher
Columbia Records singles